Fuorn Pass or Ofen Pass (Romansh: Pass dal Fuorn) (el. 2149 m.) is a high alpine mountain pass in the canton of Graubünden in Switzerland. The name is based on the ovens that were used in ironworks in the area. The ruins of these ovens can still be seen from nearby trails.

It connects Zernez in the Engadin valley with Val Müstair, crossing the Swiss National Park in Switzerland.

It was here that a brown bear (Ursus arctos) was seen and photographed in July 2005 - the first sighting of a wild bear in Switzerland since 1923

In 2004, the biggest Honey fungus spotted in Europe was found near the Pass. The fungus is about 1,000 years old and its diameter is estimated at 500 to 800 meters.

See also
 List of highest paved roads in Europe
 List of mountain passes
List of the highest Swiss passes

References

External links 
 Profile on climbbybike.com
 
 Hike:Fuorn Hike Switzerland, Graubünden

Gallery 

Engadin
Mountain passes of Graubünden
Mountain passes of Switzerland
Mountain passes of the Alps
Val Müstair
Zernez